is a Japanese photographer.

Collections
Ashida's work is included in the collection of the Tokyo Photographic Art Museum, the Museum of Contemporary Art Tokyo,

References

Japanese photographers
1945 births
Living people
Place of birth missing (living people)
Date of birth missing (living people)